Jasliq is an urban-type settlement of Qoʻngʻirot District in Karakalpakstan in Uzbekistan. It is connected by road to Qaraqalpaqstan in the northwest, and Kunkhodzha in the southeast. Its population was 3,791 people in 1989, and 4,600 in 2016.

Jasliq contains a notorious prison, where in 2010, the Independent Human Rights Defenders of Uzbekistan reported the deaths of 39 prisoners. Torture and deaths from violence are not uncommon at the prison.

References

Populated places in Karakalpakstan
Urban-type settlements in Uzbekistan